These are the Canadian number-one albums of 1991. The chart was compiled and published by RPM every Saturday.

See also
List of Canadian number-one singles of 1991

References

1991
1991 record charts
1991 in Canadian music